Timble is a village in the Harrogate district of North Yorkshire, England. It is situated on the slopes of the Washburn valley, north of Otley and close to Swinsty and Fewston reservoirs.

In 1988, the diaries of local man John Dickinson were published, providing considerable insight into the history of the village and the surrounding area. In the 17th century, the village was home to The Witches of Timble, who were accused of witchcraft by local poet Edward Fairfax, and tried but acquitted twice at York.

The village has one pub, the Timble Inn. It was closed in 2004 but was re-opened in September 2009 as a Free House following an extensive refurbishment.

The Yorkshire Water Way goes through Timble.

Etymology 
The name Timble may be of Brittonic origin and derived from the elements din, "a hill fort", and mę:l, "bald, bare". It may otherwise have a connection with Old English tumbian, "to tumble", although verbs rarely form the basis of settlement names.

Parishes 
The village of Timble is the principal settlement in the civil parish of Great Timble.  East of the village is the separate civil parish of Little Timble, which includes Swinsty Hall, a Grade I listed building (presently the home of Gareth Southgate), and the western side of Swinsty Reservoir.  Little Timble has only a small population, estimated at 10.

The two parishes have different histories.  Great Timble was a township in the ancient parish of Fewston.  Little Timble was a township in the large ancient parish of Otley.  Both became separate civil parishes in 1866.

References

External links

Local History

Villages in North Yorkshire